The James Johnston House is a property in Brentwood, Tennessee that dates from c.1840 and that was listed on the National Register of Historic Places in 1976.  It has also been known as Isola Bella.

It includes Greek Revival and Georgian architecture.

According to a 1988 study of historic resources in Williamson County, the house was one of about thirty surviving "significant brick and frame residences" that had been "the center of large plantations and they display some of the finest construction of the ante-bellum era."  It is among houses in the county having "two-story porticos with large square two-story columns with Doric motif capitals."

See also
Mooreland, also on the pike north of Franklin and NRHP-listed
Mountview, also on the pike north of Franklin and NRHP-listed
Aspen Grove, also on the pike north of Franklin and a Williamson County historic resource
Thomas Shute House, also on the pike north of Franklin and a Williamson County historic resource
Alpheus Truett House, also on the pike north of Franklin and a Williamson County historic resource

References

Houses on the National Register of Historic Places in Tennessee
Houses in Williamson County, Tennessee
Greek Revival houses in Tennessee
Georgian architecture in Tennessee
Houses completed in 1840
National Register of Historic Places in Williamson County, Tennessee